Oswald is a suburb of the City of Maitland local government area in the Hunter Region of New South Wales, Australia, approximately  from the Maitland CBD.

References

Suburbs of Maitland, New South Wales